Adolf Mathis (22 May 1938 – 19 February 2021) was a Swiss alpine skier. He competed at the 1960 Winter Olympics and the 1964 Winter Olympics. Until his retirement in 2003, he was in charge of the Huetstock hunting reserve. He was considered a profound expert on chamois game and also worked as a game controller. He played a leading role in the film Der Wildhüter am Brisen.

References

External links
 

1938 births
2021 deaths
Swiss male alpine skiers
Olympic alpine skiers of Switzerland
Alpine skiers at the 1960 Winter Olympics
Alpine skiers at the 1964 Winter Olympics
Sportspeople from Nidwalden
Place of death missing
20th-century Swiss people